RuPaul's Secret Celebrity Drag Race is an American reality competition series that premiered April 24, 2020 on VH1. A spin-off of RuPaul's Drag Race, the series features celebrities competing for charity, mentored by alumni of the Drag Race franchise.

The first season consisted of self-contained episodes based on the format of the main series, with three celebrity contestants competing in popular Drag Race challenges. For its second season, the format was changed to a season-length competition focused on lip sync performances, with a field of celebrities concealed via drag personas.

Format 

Both seasons of the series have featured celebrity contestants competing for charity, becoming drag performers mentored by alumni from previous seasons of RuPaul's Drag Race (billed as "Queen Supremes").

In its first season, each episode was a self-contained competition between three contestants, who competed in "fan favorite" Drag Race challenges. Similarly to the main series, each episode featured mini and maxi challenges, followed by a final lip sync round to determine the winner.

The second season switched to a season-length competition focusing exclusively on lip sync performances. The season began with a cast of nine contestants, identified only by drag personas. In each episode, the contestants give a solo lip sync performance for the judges and a studio audience. The bottom two contestants compete in a "Lip Sync for Your Life" round to determine who advances to the next episode, and who is eliminated and must reveal their true identity. The last remaining celebrity at the end of the season would win $100,000 for their chosen charity. The new format was described as having similarities to The Masked Singer. 

The series maintains the same judging panel as the main series, consisting of RuPaul, Michelle Visage, Carson Kressley, and Ross Mathews.

Broadcast 
The series was initially announced in October 2019 under the working title RuPaul's Celebrity Drag Race, with the title changed prior to launch. The first season premiered on April 24, 2020 on VH1, as a four-part miniseries. In August 2021, VH1 renewed the series for a second season, which premiered on August 12, 2022.

Awards and nominations

References

External links
 Official site (in English)

2020 American television series debuts
2020s American LGBT-related television series
2020s American reality television series
American LGBT-related reality television series
American television spin-offs
Celebrity reality television series
Reality television spin-offs
RuPaul's Drag Race
Television series by World of Wonder (company)
VH1 original programming